McGowen is an island platformed METRORail light rail station in Houston, Texas, United States. The station was opened on January 1, 2004 and is operated by the Metropolitan Transit Authority of Harris County, Texas (METRO). Located in Midtown, this station is at the intersection of Main Street and McGowen Street. The station is split into two platforms: northbound is located on Main north of McGowen and southbound is located on Main south of McGowen.

Design and artwork 
The McGowen station was designed by local artist Floyd Newsum, as "an interpretation of the look and feel of the physical landscape of Midtown Houston." This includes mosaic-paneled columns, skyline-patterned railings and colored pavement along the platform. Motifs include images from historical Third Ward mansions. The mosaic panels were made by artist Jonathan Brown and NATEX Corporation was the station's architect.

References

METRORail stations
Railway stations in the United States opened in 2004
2004 establishments in Texas
Midtown, Houston
Railway stations in Harris County, Texas